The N61 road is a national secondary road in County Roscommon in Ireland, linking Athlone, Roscommon, Tulsk, and Boyle. It also connects the N6, N63, N60, N5, and N4 national primary and national secondary roads, as well as seven regional roads.

The government legislation that defines the N61, the Roads Act 1993 (Classification of National Roads) Order 2012, provides the following official description:

N61: Athlone, County Westmeath — Boyle, County Roscommon

Between its junction with N6 at Bogganfin and its junction with N4 at Tawnytaskin via Kiltoom, Lecarrow, Knockcroghery, Ballymurray; Athlone Road and Circular Road in the town of Roscommon; Cloonbrackna, Carrownalassan, Tulsk Cross, Shankill, Ratallen, Greatmeadow; Elphin Street, Carrick Road, Sligo Road (and via Military Road, Main Street and Bridge Street) in the town of Boyle; and Knockashee all in the county of Roscommon.

See also
Roads in Ireland 
Motorways in Ireland

References

National secondary roads in the Republic of Ireland
Roads in County Roscommon